Baliochila hildegarda, the Hildegard's buff, is a butterfly in the family Lycaenidae. It is found in eastern Kenya, Tanzania, Malawi, Zambia and the Democratic Republic of the Congo (Shaba). Its habitat consists of woodland and forest margins at attitudes ranging from sea level to 1,600 metres.

References

Butterflies described in 1887
Poritiinae
Butterflies of Africa
Taxa named by William Forsell Kirby